The Nelson Monument is a commemorative obelisk built in 1806 in honour of Vice Admiral Horatio Nelson, constructed the year after his death at the Battle of Trafalgar. It is located within Glasgow Green, a historic public park in Glasgow, Scotland.

The obelisk was designed by the architect David Hamilton.
A plaque in front of the column records that it was the first civic monument in Britain to Nelson's victories, funded by a public subscription. The foundation stone was laid on 1 August 1806, and the monument was constructed by the mason A. Brockett.

Soon after its construction, the obelisk was struck by lightning, leaving a long structural crack in the monument: this event was depicted in a painting by John Knox, which is now in the nearby People's Palace museum. In 1965 a tablet was added to the plinth commemorating James Watt's use of Glasgow Green while thinking about an improved steam engine.

The monument became a category A listed building in 1970.

References

Obelisks in Scotland
Category A listed buildings in Glasgow
Glasgow Green